The Karnataka State Film Award for Best Short Film is a state film award of the Indian state of Karnataka given during the annual Karnataka State Film Awards. The award honors the talented makers of Short Films in Kannada Cinema.

Winners

References

2015 establishments in Karnataka
Karnataka State Film Awards
Kannada-language films